The Works is an American television program that aired on History Channel from July to September 2008. Each episode of the program focuses on the history and processes used for common objects and services.

Overview
The host Daniel H. Wilson "puts the everyday under a microscope to reveal unseen secrets and history, and finding enough fascinating facts that would make anyone scratch their head in amazement".

Episodes

Broadcast history and availability
The first eight episodes of The Works aired at 10 pm ET on Thursday nights. Episode nine aired on a Friday at 8 pm ET, and episode ten the following Thursday at 8 pm ET.

Several episodes are available for free at the History Channel web site and on some video on demand services.

Episodes are also available, for a fee, through iTunes.

References

External links
 
 History Channel's The Works website
 Daniel H. Wilson's official website

2008 American television series debuts
2008 American television series endings
History (American TV channel) original programming